Tehkummah is a township in the Canadian province of Ontario, located on Manitoulin Island.

Communities

The best known community in the township is South Baymouth, the northern docking point of the MS Chi-Cheemaun passenger-car ferry which traverses the Main Channel of Georgian Bay from the community of Tobermory on the Bruce Peninsula. At the dock, the provincial Highway 6, whose southern segment ends at Tobermory, resumes and continues northward to its terminus at Highway 17 north of Espanola.

The administrative centre of the township is the community of Tehkummah.

The township also includes the ghost towns of Michael's Bay and Snowville.

Demographics 

Climate

See also
List of townships in Ontario

References

External links

Municipalities in Manitoulin District
Single-tier municipalities in Ontario
Township municipalities in Ontario
Communities in Manitoulin Island